Michael Kuffer (born 16 March 1972) is a German lawyer and politician of the Christian Social Union (CSU) who served as a member of the Bundestag from the state of Bavaria from 2017 to 2021.

Political career 
Kuffer became a member of the Bundestag in the 2017 German federal election, representing the Munich South constituency. He was a member of the Committee on Home Affairs and the Committee on the Environment, Nature Conservation and Nuclear Safety. In this capacity, he serves as his parliamentary group’s rapporteur on emergency management.

He narrowly lost his seat to the Greens at the 2021 German federal election.

Other activities 
 German Red Cross (DRK), Member

References

External links 

  
 Bundestag biography 

1972 births
Living people
Members of the Bundestag for Bavaria
Members of the Bundestag 2017–2021
Politicians from Munich
Members of the Bundestag for the Christian Social Union in Bavaria